Enderson Norgentern de Oliveira or simply Enderson (born January 16, 1988 in Faxinal-PR), is a Brazilian goalkeeper.

Contract
4 March 2006 to 28 February 2009

See also
Football in Brazil
List of football clubs in Brazil

References

External links
 CBF
 zerozero.pt
 sambafoot
 Guardian Stats Centre

1988 births
Living people
Brazilian footballers
Figueirense FC players
Association football goalkeepers